Stenoglene bouyeri is a moth in the family Eupterotidae. It was described by Patrick Basquin in 2013. It is found in Cameroon and Gabon.

References

Moths described in 2013
Janinae